Orkesta was a parish with 1103 inhabitants (2003), located in Vallentuna Municipality, Stockholm County in Sweden. The parish is since 2006 a part of Vallentuna parish.

See also
Orkesta Runestones

Geography of Stockholm
Uppland